The 1967 NCAA University Division baseball tournament was played at the end of the 1967 NCAA University Division baseball season to determine the national champion of college baseball.  The tournament concluded with eight teams competing in the College World Series, a double-elimination tournament in its twenty-first year.  Eight regional districts sent representatives to the College World Series with preliminary rounds within each district serving to determine each representative.  These events would later become known as regionals.  Each district had its own format for selecting teams, resulting in 25 teams participating in the tournament at the conclusion of their regular season, and in some cases, after a conference tournament.  The twenty-first tournament's champion was Arizona State, coached by Bobby Winkles.  The Most Outstanding Player was Ron Davini of Arizona State.

Tournament
The opening rounds of the tournament were played across eight district sites across the country, each consisting of between two and four teams. The winners of each District advanced to the College World Series.

Bold indicates winner.

District 1 at Amherst, MA

District 2 at Princeton, NJ

District 3 at Gastonia, NC

District 4 at Carbondale, IL

District 5 at Stillwater, OK

District 6 at Houston, TX & Austin, TX

District 7 at Phoenix, AZ

District 8 at Stanford, CA & Fresno, CA

College World Series

Participants

Results

Bracket

Game results

All-Tournament Team
The following players were members of the All-Tournament Team.

Notable players
 Arizona State: Randy Bobb, Gary Gentry, Larry Gura, Jack Lind, Scott Reid
 Auburn: Q.V. Lowe
 Boston College: 
 Houston: Tom Paciorek
 Ohio State: Bo Rein
 Oklahoma State: Larry Burchart, Danny Thompson
 Rider: 
 Stanford: Bob Boone, Frank Duffy, Bob Gallagher, Pete Hamm, Mark Marquess, Don Rose, Harvey Shank, Sandy Vance

Tournament Notes
GAME 12–Auburn vs. Stanford–The rain out.

At the bottom of the 7th inning Auburn was losing 5-3 to Stanford. Auburn had 2 men on and no outs, with hot hitting Billy Hutchins (8  for 11, and 2 home runs) at bat, when the bottom fell out of the sky and began to rain heavily. Instead of finishing the game the next day, Stanford was deemed the winner by rain out. First rain out victory in College World Series history.

See also
 1967 NAIA World Series

References

NCAA Division I Baseball Championship
1967 NCAA University Division baseball season
Baseball in Austin, Texas
Baseball in Houston